Lick Skillet or Lickskillet may refer to:

Lickskillet, Kentucky (disambiguation), several places
Lickskillet, Missouri, an unincorporated community
Lick Skillet, Tennessee, an unincorporated community in Decatur County
Lick Skillet, Virginia, an unincorporated community in Smyth County

See also
Lick Skillet Railroad Work Station Historic District